Tipagad is a small fort situated in the Taluka Korchi of Gadchiroli district. The nearest village is Sawargaon which is 100 km from Desaiganj ( Wadsa).

History
The fort was ruled by the Gond Prince Puram Raja who had a bodyguard of 2000 fighting men, 5 elephants and 25 horses. He held the entire Vairagad Fort country under his control. He was attacked by the King of Chhattisgarh. The Puram Raja won the battle but after an untowards incident,  along with the queen were drowned in the lake and the fort became desolate.

Places to visit
This fort is located far away from human habitation in dense teak forest. This fort was earlier part of Murumgaon zamindari area. The fort is flanked by bastion with a large water tank about 150 mt in width. The tank has embankment and steps along its water face. The fort has an outer wall and inner Balekilla raised on a hill top.

See also
List of forts in Maharashtra
Gadchiroli

References

Buildings and structures of the Maratha Empire
16th-century forts in India
Buildings and structures in Maharashtra
Vidarbha
Gadchiroli district